Margarites salmoneus, common name the salmon margarite,  is a species of sea snail, a marine gastropod mollusk in the family Margaritidae.

Description
The size of the shell varies between 5 mm and 11 mm.

Distribution
This species occurs in the Pacific Ocean from Washington to Southern California, USA.

References

External links
 To Biodiversity Heritage Library (1 publication)
 To Encyclopedia of Life
 To ITIS
 To World Register of Marine Species
 

salmoneus
Gastropods described in 1864